Loh Kean Yew (born 26 June 1997) is a Singaporean badminton player. He is the former men's singles world champion, winning the title at the 2021 BWF World Championships, becoming the first Singaporean to achieve this feat.

Born in Penang, Malaysia, Loh's success as a child within its state team saw him receive a scholarship from the Singapore Sports School. He made his international debut for Singapore at the 2015 Southeast Asian Games, becoming a Singaporean citizen that same year. He went on to represent Singapore in several international competitions, including the 2020 Tokyo Olympics.

Early life and education 
Loh Kean Yew was born on 26 June 1997 in Penang, Malaysia, as the youngest son with three elder brothers, to his parents Loh Pin Keat and Grace Gan. His mother described him as "very cheeky" when he was young, and able to talk his way out of trouble. Loh's elder brother, Kean Hean, is also a member of the Singapore national badminton team.

According to Loh, he began playing badminton at the age of four, at the gate of his house, along with his brothers and his neighbour. He stopped playing the sport at age seven after being looked down on by his seniors, in contrast to media reports which stated that he had been "bullied" as a child. However, he resumed playing badminton at age nine. Within six months, he progressed to join the Penang state team. Loh briefly trained with the Penang Badminton Association (PBA) until the age of 12, at their badminton academy in Ayer Itam. According to the president of the PBA, Loh and his third brother Loh Kean Hean were attending training nine times a week at the prompting of their mother, and they were trained by two Chinese coaches, Li Mu and Chao Yue. Loh won the 2009 National Junior Grand Prix Finals by defeating Malaysia's Lee Zii Jia in the under-12 final.

In 2007, Loh visited Singapore for the first time, as his brother Kean Hean attended a trial at the Singapore Sports School, with Loh being there to help his brother warm up. Kean Hean moved to Singapore in 2009, joining Montfort Secondary School. Meanwhile, Loh visited Singapore again in 2009 for his own trial with the Singapore Sports School, where he performed well enough to be offered a place in the Singapore Sports School's Badminton Academy. Loh was also offered a place in Malaysia's Bukit Jalil Sports School but he rejected it for Singapore.

Loh moved to Singapore at the age of 13 to attend the Singapore Sports School's four-year programme from 2010 to 2013, while on a scholarship offered by the school. With Loh's parents remaining in their family home in George Town, they relied on support in Singapore to look after Loh, stemming from sources such as Loh's maternal uncle, plus an ex-classmate of Loh's father, as well as the family of Kean Hean's doubles partner Terry Hee. Loh said that his initial reaction was anger, but he had no choice because his mother "already bought the tickets". He suffered from homesickness for a period, but got better when he called his mother and cried to her, letting out the unhappiness. Loh credited his peers for not judging his accent and allowing him to fit in with them, and also credits the school staff for taking care of him. He had badminton trainings twice a day at the Singapore Sports School. From late 2011 onwards, Loh was coached by Kelvin Ho, a former Singapore national badminton player.

After graduating from the Singapore Sports School, Loh continued his education at Republic Polytechnic (RP), studying Sports and Leisure Management. In 2015, Loh officially became a Singaporean citizen. Also that year, after Loh had turned 18, he informed his mother that he would drop out of his schooling to become a professional sportsman, as Loh wanted to focus on badminton full-time. His mother said that the family was "shocked", and recounted telling Loh: "I sent him to Singapore to study, but now he wants to give that up to play badminton?" However, the family ultimately "trusted" and "supported" Loh because he was "mature", "disciplined and knew what he wanted to do", said his mother. As such, Loh dropped out of Republic Polytechnic after one year of study.

Career

2012–2013: Senior circuits exposure
2012 marked the start of Loh's professional career. At age 15, Loh played in his first senior tournament at the 2012 Chinese Taipei Open in October. He participated in two events, the men's singles and the mixed doubles. In the men's singles event, he managed to defeat Lei Io Meng of Macau in the first round, 21–14, 21–10. However, he would lose to his compatriot Robin Gonansa in the second round, 15–21, 13–21. In the mixed doubles event, he partnered Dellis Yuliana but they were overpowered by the more experienced Chinese Tapei pair, Chen Hung-ling and Chien Yu-chin in the first round with a scoreline of 8–21, 12–21.

In 2013, he participated in eight more tournaments throughout the year, either in the men's singles discipline, doubles, or both. His best showing was in the singles events where he reached the second round of both the Malaysia Masters and Indonesia Masters. In the Malaysia Masters held in April, Loh defeated Tam Chun Hei of Hong Kong in straight sets, 21–18, 21–18, to begin the tournament. He would then lose to Indonesia's Alamsyah Yunus, the eventual winner, 19–21, 19–21, in the second round. In the Indonesia Masters held in September, he breezed past Indonesia's Eka Fajar Kusuma in the first round, 21–19, 21–8 but lost to Iskandar Zulkarnain Zainuddin of Malaysia in the next round, in rubber games, 17–21, 21–16, 13–21.

2014–2020: First World Tour success and Four International titles
In 2014, Loh won that year's Singapore International Series tournament, with International Series events being the fourth tier of Badminton World Federation events at the time.

At the age of 17, Loh (world no. 139) represented Singapore at the 2015 Southeast Asian Games in the men's singles event, and won a bronze after being defeated by Mohamad Arif Abdul Latif in the semi-final. He was also in the men's team in 2015, 2017 and 2019, where he won bronzes in all three editions. He also won the Singapore and Malaysia International tournaments in 2017.

Loh served his National Service (NS) for the Singapore Armed Forces (SAF) from 2016 to 2018, eventually earning the rank of corporal first class (CFC). During his service, he continued to train and play badminton for the Singapore Armed Forces Sports Association (SAFSA), as well as represented his country at various major events such as the 2017 Southeast Asian Games and the 2018 Commonwealth Games. In 2017, he stated that his goal is to eventually win an Olympic gold medal for Singapore in badminton. In 2018, he received the best sportsman award by SAFSA.

At the 2018 Commonwealth Games in Gold Coast, Loh lost to Lee Chong Wei in the quarter-finals in the men's singles event, and lost 0–3 in the bronze medal playoff to England in the Mixed team event. Loh lost to Rajiv Ouseph in the second match, losing 22–20, 15–21, 23–25 in three games. Thereafter, he won his fourth International Series/Challenge title, the 2018 Mongolia International tournament. That same year, Loh briefly joined the Langhøj Badminton Club in Denmark for 3 months.

During the Thailand Masters in 2019, As a qualifier, Loh won against China's Zhou Zeqi, Zhao Junpeng, and Chinese Taipei's Wang Tzu-wei before advancing to the semifinals. He took the semifinals against Brice Leverdez in an eventual 2–1 win. He played against China's Lin Dan in the final and won with a score of 21–19, 21–18.

At Loh's first World Championships, he lost to Chinese Taipei's Chou Tien-chen in the round of 16, losing 13–21, 21–18, 17–21 in three games.

Loh won the men's singles silver medal in 2019 Southeast Asian Games, losing in the final match against Lee Zii Jia of Malaysia. Loh also won his first National Championships title that year, defeating compatriot Lee Wei Hong in the final.

2021: Rise to World Champion

Loh qualified for the 2020 Summer Olympics after placing 18th in the Race to Tokyo men's singles rankings. He was the flag bearer for Singapore during the Parade of Nations. In July 2021, Loh was eliminated from the Olympics in the group stage; he won a match against Aram Mahmoud in straight games, and lost to Jonatan Christie, the seventh seed, in a closely-contested rubber game.

From August 2021, Loh attended a one-month training camp in Dubai arranged by Denmark's Olympic badminton champion Viktor Axelsen, joining Axelsen and fellow players Toby Penty from England, Brian Yang from Canada, Felix Burestedt from Sweden, Lakshya Sen from India, as well as teenagers Axel Parkhoi and Marcus Viscovich from Denmark. There were 12 training sessions per week, with a training style similar to interval training with 90-second drills, said Loh. Loh followed this with three weeks of training with France's national badminton squad at INSEP near Paris.

In mid-October 2021, Loh (world no. 41) took part in the Dutch Open as the second seed. Loh won the tournament by prevailing in the finals 21–12, 21–16 over top seed Lakshya Sen (world no. 25), Loh's former training partner. It was Loh's first tournament victory since 2019; the win netted him S$1,900. In late October 2021, Loh participated in the 2021 Denmark Open but was eliminated in the first round by a 19–21, 14–21 score to Viktor Axelsen (world no. 2), Loh's former training partner.

Also in late October 2021, Loh took part in the 2021 French Open where he defeated Malaysian Lee Zii Jia (world no. 8) by a score of 24–22, 21–14 in the first round, but then lost to Lakshya Sen in the next round 17–21, 13–21. Loh's coach Kelvin Ho said on this loss that it "was not the first time Kean Yew had let comments on social media or his own expectations get to him", stating that he told Loh that his "mentality wasn't right - you may think you are there, but you are not there yet", reminding Loh to focus on "processes and routines" instead of "what the final result should be". Ho further stated that Loh had been "pressured" after reading many congratulatory messages on social media after he defeated Lee, but Loh "learned his lesson well and very quickly", and in the next tournament onwards, Loh stayed away from social media, including a social media blackout during the BWF World Championships later that year.

In early November 2021, Loh (world no. 39) won the 2021 Hylo Open in Saarbrucken, Germany, which was the first time he won a Super 500 event (the fourth highest tier of the BWF World Tour). The unseeded Loh defeated top seed Chou Tien-chen (world no. 4), a Taiwanese, in the first round 21–18, 21–13. After dispatching France's Toma Junior Popov (world no. 35) and Denmark's Rasmus Gemke (world no. 13), Loh then defeated Lakshya Sen in the semi-finals 21–18, 21–12. In the finals, Loh again defeated Lee Zii Jia (world no. 8), this time with a score of 19–21, 21–13, 17–12 when Lee retired due to injury. Loh won S$32,400 in prize money as a result.

In mid-November 2021, Loh (world no. 30) took part in the 2021 Indonesia Masters, where he defeated Wang Tzu-wei (world no. 11), a Taiwanese, in the first round, but lost in the next round to Wang's compatriot Chou Tien-chen 10–21, 12–21. In late November 2021, Loh participated in the 2021 Indonesia Open, a Super 1000 tournament. In the round of 16, Loh defeated the defending 2-time world champion Kento Momota (world no. 1), from Japan, with a score of 21–7, 17–21, 21–19. Subsequent wins over Danish players Hans-Kristian Vittinghus (world no. 21) and Rasmus Gemke sent Loh into the finals, where Loh lost to Viktor Axelsen 13–21, 21–9, 13–21. His run was the best performance by a Singaporean male shuttler since Ronald Susilo's singles win at the 2004 Japan Open, a Super 750 tournament. However, the loss meant that Loh failed to qualify for the 2021 BWF World Tour Finals.

2021 BWF World Championships
In the 2021 BWF World Championships men's singles tournament in Huelva, Spain, the unseeded Loh (world no. 22) beat reigning Olympic champion and second seed Viktor Axelsen (world no. 1) in the first round with a score of 14–21, 21–9, 21–6 on 14 December. This was Loh's first victory over his former training partner. In the second and third rounds, Loh breezed past Austria's Luka Wraber (world no. 93) 21–4, 21–8, and Thailand's Kantaphon Wangcharoen (world no. 20), the sixteenth seed, 21–4, 21–7. In the quarter-finals, Loh defeated India's Prannoy H. S. (world no. 32) 21–14, 21–12, his first victory against Prannoy after two previous losses. Thus, Loh qualified for the semi-finals and guaranteed a medal at the World Championships, a feat never achieved before by any Singaporean. While playing against Prannoy, Loh sprained his right ankle.

In the semi-finals on December 18, Loh defeated the third seed, Denmark's Anders Antonsen (world no. 3) 23–21, 21–14  to qualify for the finals. After the semi-final match, Loh's right ankle injury had deteriorated to the point that he could not walk and required a wheelchair. Loh later said that his physiotherapist (Ho Jiaying) worked on his foot from 10.30pm to 1.30am to ensure that he could walk again. In the finals, Loh further made Singaporean history by winning the 2021 BWF World Championships, defeating the twelfth seed, India's Srikanth Kidambi (world no. 14) in a 43-minute match with a score of 21–15, 22–20. After the win, Loh credited people from the Singapore Badminton Association, Sport Singapore, Singapore Sport Institute and "many others" for help and support during his journey. His return to Singapore's Changi Airport was greeted with a water salute at the tarmac, similar to Joseph Schooling after he had won a gold medal at the 2016 Summer Olympics in swimming.

2022: Commonwealth and Badminton Asia Team bronzes
Loh started the season with a defeat in the final of the India Open to Lakshya Sen in straight games, with a score of 22–24, 17–21. In February, he won a historic bronze with the Singapore men's team at the Badminton Asia Team Championships, the first in the nation's history and in the process, booked a spot in the Thomas Cup to be held in May. Loh then fell in the first rounds of the German and All England Open, where he lost to Brian Yang and Anders Antonsen respectively, both in 3 games. He later tested positive for COVID-19 while in England, and subsequently withdrew from the Swiss Open, Korea Open and the Korea Masters, the last 2 of which he chose to withdraw since he did not get a chance to train in March due to COVID-19. At the 2022 Badminton Asia Championships, Loh, the 6th seed, was eliminated in the quarter-finals stage, losing to Jonatan Christie, the 4th seed, in 2 straight sets, 20–22, 21–23. In his first Thomas Cup appearance, Loh played well, winning all his matches as the first singles, beating Indonesia's Anthony Sinisuka Ginting (21–13, 21–14), South Korea's Heo Kwang-hee (21–14, 21–12) and Thailand's Khosit Phetpradab (21–15, 21–18) in straight sets to earn the points for Singapore in every series. However, it will turn out to be futile as Singapore will go on to lose in all three series thus missing out on a place in the knockout round.

During the 2021 Southeast Asian Games in Hanoi, Loh entered the men's team event, playing the first singles for Singapore. Singapore then ended up losing 2–3 to Malaysia in the semifinals despite having a 2–0 lead, thus clinching a bronze. Later in the men's singles event, Loh was the number 1 seed. He won against Malaysia's Kok Jing Hong and Philippines' Jewel Angelo Albo in the first round and the quarter-finals. Later, he won a grueling semi-finals, barely beating Vietnam's Nguyễn Tiến Minh, the former world number 5, in three sets, 21–15, 10–21, 23–21. Clinching a ticket to the final, he ended up losing in the final to the number 2 seed and world number 18 Kunlavut Vitidsarn in straight sets, 13–21, 13–21. He therefore had to settle for the silver medal again. After the match, Loh stated that his form was "second-best" on that day and that he "could have done better".

During the 2022 Indonesia Masters, Loh, the 8th seed, won against Toma Jr Popov, Chico Aura Dwi Wardoyo and Lu Guangzu to reach the semi-finals of the tournament, meeting the 3rd seed and world number 4 Chou Tien-chen. Loh lost the match in a closely-contested rubber set match, 16–21, 21–8, 19–21 in an hour and ten minutes, losing 2 crucial points at 19-all, ending his run at the tournament. Loh then rose back to his then career-best ranking of 9th place next week, overtaking India's Lakshya Sen.

One week later, at the 2022 Indonesia Open, which was held at the same venue, Loh beat Heo Kwang-hee and Toma Jr Popov to advance to the quarter-finals. In the quarter-finals, he lost to reigning Asian champion and world number 5 Lee Zii Jia, with a score of 18–21, 16–21, 20–22, after losing a crucial match point at 20–19. After the match, Loh stated that he was satisfied with his performance but he still needed to "handle the key moments better". He also said to reporters that there was "no such thing as ‘I should have won’ until the match is actually won", which was referencing the moment he had at the rally at 20–19.

At the Malaysia Open, Loh fell in the first round to his former training partner, Lee Cheuk Yiu, in the opening round in straight sets, with a score of 19–21, 12–21 in 39 minutes. After the match, Loh said he was "quite disappointed" with his game, and stated that although Lee was a "tough opponent", but Loh was more "concerned" about his game itself. He also said that, he had a lot of "bad habits" he needed to change, and vowed to do so.

In July, Loh took part in the Singapore Open as the 6th seed. Loh advanced to the semi-finals after beating Brice Leverdez, Tommy Sugiarto and Li Shifeng in the round of 32, round of 16 and the quarter-finals respectively. In the semi-finals, Loh lost to 4th seeded Anthony Sinisuka Ginting 17–21, 14–21 in just 37 minutes. After the match, Loh said to reporters that he felt that he was not "brave enough", and that he was not able to change his tactics accordingly as a result. Loh added that he was "sorry to disappoint" fans who wanted to see him play in the final, and promised to work harder on his "game" especially at the upcoming 2022 Commonwealth Games, thanking fans for their support.

In early August, Loh was part of the Singaporean team who played at the Mixed Team event at the Commonwealth Games. In the group stage, Loh played against Mauritius' Julien Paul, winning in two straight games, 21–10, 21–12. Loh was rested against Barbados and went on to beat England's Toby Penty, beating him in two straight sets, 21–12, 21–12, contributing to Singapore's 4–1 win over England. Singapore topped Group B, earning the 4th seeded position. In the quarterfinals, Singapore won 3–0 against Scotland. Loh played against Callum Smith, winning 21–8, 21–5 in straight sets. Singapore met second seeds India in the semi-final. Loh lost to Lakshya Sen in the tie decider, losing 18–21, 15–21. Singapore lost 0–3 overall. In the bronze medal playoff, Singapore was playing against England. Despite beating Penty convincingly in the Group tie 4 days earlier, Loh struggled against the 54th-ranked englishman, winning the 3-set match, 23–25, 21–11, 25–23, taking 5 match points to secure the point for Singapore. Singapore eventually won 3–0, and won the Mixed team bronze medal.

The following week, Loh played at the men's singles event as the 1st seed. He lost to Malaysia's Ng Tze Yong in the quarterfinals, losing 21–15, 14–21, 11–21 in three games.

In late August, Loh, the 8th seed, crashed out at the quarterfinal stage at the World Championships held in Tokyo, losing 12–21, 21–17, 8–21 to three-time World Junior champion and 16th seed Kunlavut Vitidsarn in an hour and five minutes, failing to defend his world title from the previous world championships in Huelva. The following week, he played at the Japan Open. Facing India’s Prannoy H. S. in the second round, he lost 20–22, 19–21, in 44 minutes.

In the first week of October, Loh rose to his then career-rank high of 5, replacing Kento Momota, who fell 2 spots after an update of ranking points. This made Loh the first men's singles player from Singapore to reach the top 5, the closest player prior to this achievement being Ronald Susilo who achieved a career high of 6th in 2004. In mid October, at the Denmark Open, Loh defeated number 1 seed and training partner Viktor Axelsen in the quarterfinals, winning 21–17, 21–10 in 30 minutes, ending Axelsen's 39 match-winning streak he held since the All England Open. However, Loh lost in the semi-finals to Malaysia's Lee Zii Jia in straight games the next day, losing 18–21, 15–21 in 39 minutes. The following week at the French Open, Loh made it to the quarterfinals of the event, before bowing out to number 1 seed Viktor Axelsen 11–21, 17–21 in a repeat of the quarterfinals a week prior in Denmark.

In early November, Loh participated in the Hylo Open as the number 4 seed. After defeating Shi Yuqi and Shesar Hiren Rhustavito in the first and second round, Loh crashed out to 5th seed and eventual winner Anthony Sinisuka Ginting in the quarterfinals, losing in straight games, 13–21, 14–21. After the tournament concluded, Loh rose 2 spots to his new career-high ranking of 3rd, replacing Anders Antonsen who fell to 5th after an update of ranking points.

At the Australian Open 2 weeks later, Loh won against Low Pit Seng and Li Shifeng in the first and second rounds. In the quarter-final, facing the unseeded Shi Yuqi, Loh, the second seed, lost 21–17, 16–21, 13–21 in three games. However, despite the loss, Loh managed to gain enough ranking points to qualify for the 2022 BWF World Tour Finals held in Bangkok next month, becoming the first male player from Singapore to ever qualify for the season-ending final.

In December, at the final tournament of the year, the World Tour Finals, Loh was drawn into Group B with Chou Tien-chen, Anthony Sinisuka Ginting, and Jonatan Christie. In his first 
group stage encounter with Chou Tien-chen, Loh defeated him in straight games, 21–15, 21–17. In the second encounter with Jonatan Christie, Loh lost in three games, 21–16, 20–22, 10–21, failing to convert his 2 match points in the second set. In his final group encounter with Anthony Sinisuka Ginting, Loh lost in straight games, 12–21, 21–23. Loh placed 3rd in the group and did not progress to the semi-finals knockout stage.

2023
In the first tournament of the year at the Malaysia Open, after beating Li Shifeng and Zhao Junpeng in the first and second rounds, Loh crashed out in the quarter-finals to 8th seed Kunlavut Vitidsarn in 3 games, 11–21, 22–20, 14–21 in an hour and 20 minutes.

At the India Open the following week, Loh exited at the quarter finals again to Kunlavut Vitidsarn, this time losing in straight games, 12–21, 17–21 in 39 minutes. This was Loh's 5th consecutive defeat to Vitidsarn.

At the Indonesia Masters, Loh crashed out in the 2nd round to home player Chico Aura Dwi Wardoyo in straight games, 18–21, 15–21. This was Loh's first loss to Wardoyo in 5 meetings.

At the German Open, Loh crashed out in the 2nd round to Kenta Nishimoto, losing 17–21, 21–13, 19–21 in three games.

At the  All England Open the following week, Loh crashed out in the first round to Zhao Jun Peng, losing 16–21, 21–16, 7–21 in three games.

Personal life 
Loh's initials, LKY, has been noted by Singaporeans as being identical to Lee Kuan Yew, Singapore's first prime minister and its founding father. Loh himself responded to this observation, stating while laughing during an interview, that "Name not I chose one, but it's nice lah [sic]!"

Awards and nominations 

Loh was nominated for the following lists and awards : 
Received the 2020 Meritorious Award from the Singapore National Olympic Committee (SNOC)
Won The Straits Times' Athlete of the Year 2021
Included in the Forbes 30 under 30 Asia 2022 list in the Entertainment and Sports category
Won the SNOC Sportsman of the Year 2021
Nominated for BWF Male Player of the Year Award for 2021/2022 season

Achievements

BWF World Championships 
Men's singles

Southeast Asian Games 
Men's singles

BWF World Tour (2 titles, 4 runners-up) 
The BWF World Tour, which was announced on 19 March 2017 and implemented in 2018, is a series of elite badminton tournaments sanctioned by the Badminton World Federation (BWF). The BWF World Tour is divided into levels of World Tour Finals, Super 1000, Super 750, Super 500, Super 300, and the BWF Tour Super 100.

Men's singles

BWF International Challenge/Series (5 titles, 2 runners-up) 
Men's singles

  BWF International Challenge tournament
  BWF International Series tournament

Performance timeline

National team 
 Junior level

 Senior level

Individual competitions

Junior level

Boys' doubles

Boys' singles

Senior level

Record against selected opponents 
Record against Year-end Finals finalists, World Championships semi-finalists, and Olympic quarter-finalists. Accurate as of 31 January 2023.

References

External links
 
 Loh Kean Yew at Singapore Badminton Association

1997 births
Badminton players at the 2020 Summer Olympics
Badminton players at the 2018 Commonwealth Games
Badminton players at the 2022 Commonwealth Games
Commonwealth Games bronze medallists for Singapore
Commonwealth Games medallists in badminton
Commonwealth Games competitors for Singapore
Competitors at the 2015 Southeast Asian Games
Competitors at the 2017 Southeast Asian Games
Competitors at the 2019 Southeast Asian Games
Living people
Malaysian emigrants to Singapore
Olympic badminton players of Singapore
People from Penang
Singaporean male badminton players
Singaporean people of Chinese descent
Singaporean people of Hokkien descent
Singapore Sports School alumni
Southeast Asian Games medalists in badminton
Southeast Asian Games bronze medalists for Singapore
Southeast Asian Games silver medalists for Singapore
Competitors at the 2021 Southeast Asian Games
21st-century Singaporean people
Medallists at the 2022 Commonwealth Games